Kabsa ( kabsah) is an Arab mixed rice dish, served on a communal platter, that originates from Yemen It is commonly regarded as a national dish in all the countries of the Arabian Peninsula (Saudi Arabia, Kuwait, Bahrain, Qatar, the United Arab Emirates, Oman, and Yemen). It can also be found in regions such as southern Iran, the Negev desert in Palestine, and the Malabar Coast of India. 

The dish is also popularly known as makbūs/machbūs. The dish is made with rice and meat.

Etymology 
The name comes from the word kabasa, literally meaning to press or squeeze, alluding to the technique used in the cooking where the ingredients are all cooked in (or "squeezed into") one pot.

Ingredients
These dishes are usually made with rice (usually basmati), meat, vegetables, and a mixture of spices. There are many kinds of kabsa and each kind has a uniqueness about it.

Pre-mixed kabsa spices are now available under several brand names. These reduce preparation time, but may have a flavor distinct from traditional kabsa. The spices used in kabsa are largely responsible for its taste; these are generally black pepper, cloves, cardamom, saffron, cinnamon, black lime, bay leaves and nutmeg.

The main ingredient that accompanies the spices is the meat. The meats used are usually chicken, goat, lamb, camel, beef, fish or shrimp. In chicken machbūs, a whole chicken is used.

The spices, rice, and meat may be augmented with almonds, pine nuts, peanuts, onions, and sultanas.  The dish can be garnished with ḥashū and served hot with daqqūs, which is a home-made Arabic tomato sauce.

Methods of cooking

Meat for kabsa can be cooked in various ways. A popular way of preparing meat is called mandi. this ancient technique originates from Hadramout. Whereby meat is barbecued in a deep hole in the ground that is covered while the meat cooks. Another way of preparing and serving meat for kabsa is mathbi, where seasoned meat is grilled on flat stones that are placed on top of burning embers. A third technique, madghūt, involves cooking the meat in a pressure cooker. all these techniques originate from Yemen.

See also

 Arab cuisine
Mandi

References

Middle Eastern cuisine
Saudi Arabian cuisine
Yemeni cuisine
Kuwaiti cuisine
Israeli cuisine
Palestinian cuisine
Jordanian cuisine
Emirati cuisine
Bahraini cuisine
Qatari cuisine
Omani cuisine
Iranian cuisine
Indian cuisine
National dishes
Rice dishes
Communal eating